Toombs Tobacco Farm is a historic home and farm complex located near Red Oak, Charlotte County, Virginia, USA.  Contributing resources include the main residence, summer kitchen, family cemetery, tobacco barns, smoke house, animal pens and other ancillary structures.  The main house is a -story wood frame dwelling with a standing seam metal roof in a vernacular Federal style.  A two-story rear addition was built about 1910. The Toombs family owned the property from the 1830s until 1981.

It was listed on the National Register of Historic Places in 2000.

References

Farms on the National Register of Historic Places in Virginia
Houses on the National Register of Historic Places in Virginia
Federal architecture in Virginia
Houses in Charlotte County, Virginia
National Register of Historic Places in Charlotte County, Virginia
Tobacco buildings in the United States